This is a list of provinces (provincias) and indigenous regions (comarcas indígenas) of Panama by Human Development Index as of 2021. Indigenous regions are shown in the table in italics.

Note: the HDI values are calculated using pre-2014 borders, so the newly-established Panamá Oeste Province (which was split from Panamá Province) is not included in the data.

References 

Panama
Human Development Index
Provinces and Indigenous Regions by Human Development Index
HDI
HDI